Bay Park may refer to:

 Bay Park, Michigan, an unincorporated community in Tuscola County
 Bay Park, New York, a hamlet (and census-designated place) in Nassau County
 Bay Park Square, a shopping mall in Ashwaubenon, Wisconsin